Louis Eugène Ferdinand Pouy (17 February 1824 – 21 November 1891) was a 19th-century French writer and bibliographer

After law school, he moved to Amiens and bought an auctioneer charge. He spent part of his free time in historical and bibliographic research. He became known through the publication of unpublished or little known documents and was engaged by the Ministry of Education as a correspondent. He left many books from research.

Publications 
1861: Recherches historiques sur l'imprimerie et la librairie à Amiens avec une description de livres divers imprimés dans cette ville 
1863–1864: Recherches historiques et bibliographiques sur l'imprimerie : et la librairie et sur les arts et industries qui s'y rattachent dans le département de la Somme 
1864: Rosières en Santerre
1865: Notice sur l'ancienne chapelle du Saint-Sépulcre de Saint-Firmin-le-Confesseur d'Amiens, et sur diverses fondations curieuses de Simon Le Bourguignon au XVe siècle 
1866: Démophile Dourneau : poëte à Roye en 1793 
1869: Iconographie des thèses : notice sur les thèses dites historiées soutenues ou gravées notamment par des Picards 
1869: Les Bibliographes picards 
1872: Histoire des cocardes blanches, noires, vertes et tricolores 
1872: Les faïences d'origine picarde et les collections diverses 
1873: Parodies, railleries et caricatures des anciennes thèses historiées, pour faire suite à l'iconographie des thèses 
1874: Recherches sur les almanachs & calendriers artistiques, à estampes, à vignettes, à caricatures, etc ... principalement du XVIe au XIXe siècle
1874: Anecdotes historiques sur Deschamps de Charmelieu, marquis de Saint-Bris, receveur des tailles à Auxerre, 1763-1784
1876: Histoire de François Faure, évêque d'Amiens, prédicateur de la reine Anne d'Autriche et des cours de Louis XIII et de Louis XIV, conseiller d'État, etc. d'après divers documents inédits (1612-1687)
1876: Les Anglais à Amiens pendant la Révolution : Le colonel Keating, 1792-94 avec notes historiques sur les évènements du temps 
1879: Nouvelles Recherches sur les almanachs et calendriers à partir du XVIe siècle
1882: La chambre du conseil des Etats de Picardie pendant la Ligue
1885: Concini, maréchal d'Ancre, son gouvernement en Picardie : 1611-1617 
1889: Les pèlerinages en Picardie du XIVe au XVIe siècle 
1890: Mémoire du Baron Hogguer, financier-diplomate, concernant la France et la Suède, 1700 à 1767, publié, avec des notes et documents inédits relatifs aux relations du baron avec la célèbre actrice Desmares

Sources 
 Obituary in revue Encyclopédique Larousse 1892 (pages 19-20)

References

External links 
 Ferdinand Pouy on data.bnf.fr

French bibliographers
1824 births
People from Yonne
1891 deaths